Bettina Müller (born 7 June 1959) is a German nurse, lawyer and politician of the Social Democratic Party (SPD) who has been serving as a member of the Bundestag from the state of Hesse since 2013.

Political career
Müller first became a member of the Bundestag in the 2013 German federal election, representing the Main-Kinzig – Wetterau II – Schotten district. In parliament, she has since been serving as a member of the Health Committee.

Within her parliamentary group, Müller belongs to the Parliamentary Left, a left-wing movement.

References

External links 

  
 Bundestag biography 

1959 births
Living people
Members of the Bundestag for Hesse
Female members of the Bundestag
21st-century German women politicians
Members of the Bundestag 2021–2025
Members of the Bundestag 2017–2021
Members of the Bundestag 2013–2017
Members of the Bundestag for the Social Democratic Party of Germany